Oliwia Toborek (born 11 May 2002 in Warsaw) is a Polish amateur boxer who won a silver medal at the 2022 World Championships.

Biography 
Toborek won a silver medal at the 2022 IBA Women's World Boxing Championships after losing to Gabrielė Stonkutė in the final.

References

External links 
 

Living people
2002 births
Polish women boxers
Light-heavyweight boxers
AIBA Women's World Boxing Championships medalists
21st-century Polish women